Cara Black and Liezel Huber were the defending champions, but Nadia Petrova and Katarina Srebotnik defeated them 6–4, 6–4, in the final.

Seeds

  Cara Black /  Liezel Huber (final)
  Květa Peschke /  Rennae Stubbs (quarterfinals)
  Alyona Bondarenko /  Kateryna Bondarenko (first round)
  Nadia Petrova /  Katarina Srebotnik (champions)

Draw

Draw

External links
Draw

Kremlin Cup
Kremlin Cup